Azadkənd (also, Azadakend and Azadkend) is a village and municipality in the Sabirabad Rayon of Azerbaijan.  It has a population of 1,739.

References 

Populated places in Sabirabad District